Pachydactylus sansteynae, also known commonly as the coastal thick-toed gecko or San Steyn's gecko, is a species of lizard in the family Gekkonidae. The species is endemic to Namibia.

Etymology
The specific name, sansteynae, is in honor of San Steyn who is the wife of the senior taxon authority.

Reproduction
P. sansteynae is oviparous.

References

Further reading
Michels JP, Bauer AM (2004). "Some Corrections to the Scientific Names of Amphibians and Reptiles". Bonner zoologische Beiträge 52 (1/2): 83–94. (Pachydactylus sansteynae, corrected name, p. 87).
Steyn W, Mitchell JL (1967). "Two new geckos (Pachydactylus serval sansteyni ssp. nov., Pachydactylus oreophilus gaiasensis ssp. nov.) from South West Africa". Cimbebasia (21): 9–21.

Endemic fauna of Namibia
Pachydactylus
Reptiles of Namibia
Reptiles described in 1967